Daniel Dupont (born 18 October 1945) is a Belgian former field hockey player. He competed at the 1968 Summer Olympics and the 1972 Summer Olympics.

References

External links
 

1945 births
Living people
Belgian male field hockey players
Olympic field hockey players of Belgium
Field hockey players at the 1968 Summer Olympics
Field hockey players at the 1972 Summer Olympics
People from Uccle
Field hockey players from Brussels